Cosmopterix acutivalva is a moth of the family Cosmopterigidae. It is known from Thailand.

References

acutivalva
Moths described in 1987